Mughan (also Romanized as Mūghān; also known as Moghān and Mūghūn) is a village in Varzaq-e Jonubi Rural District, in the Central District of Faridan County, Isfahan Province, Iran. At the 2006 census, its population was 664, in 159 families.

References 

Populated places in Faridan County